Massu River is a river in Pärnu and Rapla County, Estonia. The river is 37.5 km long and basin size is 78.2 km2. It runs into Vändra River.

References

Rivers of Estonia
Pärnu County
Rapla County